The Columbus International Film + Animation Festival is a Columbus, Ohio, United States annual film festival which is designed to encourage and promote the use of film and video in all forms of education and communication. 

It is the first and oldest film festival in the United States, having existed since 1952. The 2020 festival will be held April 17-18, 2020, in Columbus, OH at the Gateway Film Center. 

The present organization has been known as the Columbus International Film + Animation Festival since the 2018. As a competitive festival, it was formally known as 'The Chris Awards'.  The Festival is supported by a number of sponsors including the Ohio Arts Council and the Columbus College of Art & Design.

The Columbus Film Festival has existed since 1952, but was preceded by the foundation of the Columbus Film Council.

A number of awards are presented for each of the following categories:
The Arts
Animation
Basement Film
Broadcast Journalism
Education & Information
Narrative
The Humanities
Mental Health +Physical Health
Music Videos
Experimental Shorts
Religion + Spirituality
Science + Technology
Social Issues
Student Competition

References

External links
website

Film festivals in Ohio
Culture of Columbus, Ohio
Tourist attractions in Columbus, Ohio
November events
Film festivals established in 1952